KKVU (104.5 FM, "104.5 the U") is a commercial radio station licensed to Stevensville, Montana, serving the Missoula, Montana area, owned by Simmons Media Ventures, LLC, through licensee Missoula Broadcasting Company, LLC. KKVU airs an Adult Top 40 music format. KKVU carried Brooke and Jubal in the Morning from 2017-2019 until it was transferred to 107.5 Zoo FM

Previous logos

External links
U 104.5's Official Website

KVU
Adult top 40 radio stations in the United States
Radio stations established in 2005